Bauriinae is an extinct subfamily of therocephalian therapsids. It is one of two subdivisions of the family Bauriidae, the other being Nothogomphodontinae.

References

Bauriids
Permian first appearances
Permian extinctions
Prehistoric animal subfamilies
Therapsid subfamilies